Flushing is a city in Genesee County in the U.S. state of Michigan.  The population was 8,411 at the  2020 census. Flushing is considered a suburb of Flint. It is situated within the survey area of Flushing Charter Township, but is administratively autonomous.

Flushing originated as a mill town in the mid-1830s. Its location along the Flint River, the county's largest river, was a decisive factor in its settlement. Water power potential was a significant determinant for the selection of the settlement areas throughout the nineteenth century. In addition to its water power, the area around Flushing was also well suited to agricultural pursuits.

The name Dover originally was selected for the new village until it was discovered that the name already was in use in Lenawee County. Charles Seymour Sr., former resident of Flushing, Long Island, subsequently named the new community after the village in New York State.

History
The earliest known inhabitants of Flushing were the Sauk Indians. Evidence suggesting that the second battle of Skull Island was fought in Flushing, including mass burial mounds, were found along the Flint river near the Bailey farm; now the present day Flushing Valley Golf Club. Mounds were observed in 1833 or 1834 and about 20 mounds in total.

In 1835, Charles Seymour Sr. from New York state came to the Flushing area after purchasing land there. He formed a partnership with Horace Jerome in 1836 who had purchased water rights in the vicinity. In their partnership, Seymour would provide pine timber while Jerome would build a mill. The saw mill was  operational in the summer of 1837. Jerome left Flushing after his wildcat bank, the Flint Rapids Bank, failed in 1838. A village plat on sections 26 and 27, bearing the name of Flushing and named after the township in which it was located, was laid out December 3, 1840 by Charles Seymour Sr. In 1843 Charles sold out to his brother James Seymour. James then made an additional plat, 31, in 1847.

in 1850, a flat-bottomed boat established early transportation between Flint and Flushing.

On July 30, 1873, village women formed the Flushing Ladies' Association.

In 1874, a subscription private fire department, the Wolverine Fire Company, was formed with 35 members and Arza N. Niles as first chief engineer. Wolverine paid for a small engine designed by Captain Haas of Flint of his own design and patent.

Flushing was incorporated as a village on March 21, 1877 with its first election held on May 8, 1877. Oscar F. Clarke was elected as the first village president. After incorporation, the fire company turned over its equipment to the village. In 1878, the Haas engine was instrument in containing a major fire in the business district to just a saloon and hotel.

The Flushing Patrol, the village's first professional newspaper, was founded on October 18, 1878 by D. C. Ashmun. In 1880 the paper sold for $1.50 per year.

The paper would cost 1 dollar per year. The paper touts "The Interests of Flushing and Vicinity Will Be Observed Herein". On June 15, 1882, DeWitt C. Ashmun sold his paper, The Flushing Patrol, to Albert E. Ransom who changed its name to "The Flushing Observer".The Flushing Observer also published its first paper under that name on that same date

The railroad was first brought to Flushing in 1888. Headed by John Ashley, the Toledo and Ann Arbor Railroad connected Flushing to Durand and Saginaw. Construction reached Flushing in July 1888. On Monday, Dec. 17, 1888, the first passenger train arrived from Saginaw. The fare from Flushing to Saginaw was 80 cents. A railroad engine crossed the Flint river for the first time to Hart & Clark mill on February 7, 1889. The line is currently owned by Huron and Eastern Railway, while the restored 1888 depot is now the Flushing Area Museum and Cultural Center.

March 25, 1895 vote passes 215 to 30 for $20,000 bond to build a water works system and electric light plant. Water mains are first installed for use on Nov 1, 1895. Electricity was installed and ready for use on Nov 15, 1895, along with streetlights on Main St. By January 1897 there were 1600 incandescent lamps in the village.

The Hart Flour Mill is destroyed in a fire on March 19, 1918. It was the 3rd Mill on the site and the 3rd to burn. The mill provided electricity until it burned down in 1918, leaving the village without power for 14 months until a new power plant was built.

Main Street was paved in 1920.

In May 1922 the current bridge on Main Street over the Flint river is completed.  The bridge is a traditionally composed earth-filled closed spandrel concrete arch bridge built by L. Smith, H. A. and M. C. Nichols of Hastings, Michigan. The bridge was rehabilitated in 1998 adding new walkways and updated guardrails. The first wood bridge was built on this site in 1839. A second wood bridge in 1856. A third wood bridge in 1872 and a double span iron bridge in 1880. The iron bridge was removed in 1921.

Tucker Memorial Pool was dedicated on July 1, 1956. The pool was built with money donated to the City from the will of Max Dealton Tucker who was born in Flushing.

A book by Edmund G. Love titled The Situation in Flushing was published September 1, 1965. Edmund was born in Flushing and moved to Flint when he was 12. The book tells the account of his boyhood in the early 20th century.

Completed in 1975 by Michigan Bell Telephone at a cost of $2.2 million, the now AT&T building sits on the site of the former home of James Seymour, brother of Charles Seymour. The home was built in the 1850s and torn down prior to Bell selecting the site.

On Monday November 27, 2017, the northern loop set of municipalities, including Flushing, began receiving water from the Karegnondi Water Authority pipeline which is treated by the Genesee County Drain Commission Water and Waste Division.

On January 15, 2020, District 2 councilwoman Karianne Martus resigned due to her new job at the Flint Farmers Market. With no decision of the council to fill the vacancy, three more councilors resigned at the beginning of the Covid Pandemic citing "discord". John Olson, long-time Planning Commission member, was appointed to serve as city councilman (temporary) in late March 2020 by Genesee County Election Commission.  City Manager Brad Barrett was terminated April 20, 2020 at the city council meeting citing ethical concerns and Clarence Goodlein was immediately appointed interim City Manager. A special election was held on August 4, 2020 to fill the vacancies. Councilmen Dan Fralick, Eric Johnson, Dane Miller and councilwoman Danielle Smith were each elected to four year terms.

Government and politics 
The city of Flushing is a Council-Manager form of government. The original city charter was adopted Nov 3, 1964 and updated Nov 2, 1993. The Flushing Fire Department is an on call fire fighting service for the city as well as Flushing Township. The command staff consists of a chief, an assistant chief, a battalion chief, two captains and three lieutenants and other firefighters for a total of 20. The City of Flushing Police Department provides police coverage 24 hours a day with Chief, Detective and fourteen (14) patrol officers including a fulltime school resource officer for city elementary schools. The City of Flushing and Flushing township police regularly cooperate to improve services for both communities.  The township receives water from the Karegnondi Water Authority pipeline treated by the Genesee County Drain Commission Water and Waste Division.

Flushing is part of the following:
 Genesee County Commissioner District 8
 Michigan House of Representatives District 49
 State Senate District 69th
 67th District Court Division 1
 Michigan's 5th Congressional District
 Flushing Area Library operated by the Genesee District Library

Education 
Primary and secondary education are provided by Flushing Community Schools. Since 1954, Flushing is also home to Saint Robert Catholic School for Pre-K through 8th grade.

Geography
The Flushing area is dominated by the Flint River Valley. The Flint River flows in a northerly direction along the southern and western portions of the city and continues north bisecting Flushing Township. The valley is characterized by rich sandy loam ideal for the growth of vegetation. As a result, the valley is characterized by dense woodlots containing many varieties of trees and providing scenic and natural settings for the area.

Neighborhoods 

The Main Street Historic District includes buildings on Main St from Maple to 628 (East) Main St and the Flushing Depot at 431 W Main St. Properties in this district are listed on the National Register of Historic Places. 82 structures located on 22.4 acres of land create the district with commercial buildings reflecting ornate Italianate and early twentieth century styles constructed between 1850 and 1918 and residences exhibiting a wide variety of Greek Revival, Italianate, Queen Anne, Colonial Revival, and Bungaloid styles and their vernacular derivatives built from 1850 to 1932. Properties we added as part of the Main Street Historic Commercial District and the Genesee County MRA (Multiple Resource Area).

Environment 
Flushing's wastewater treatment includes an activated sludge treatment system installed in 1972 and a batch reactor treatment system that was added in 1988. Sewage is split between the two systems. Cleaned water is disinfected with UV light before being discharged into the Flint river. The plant is on 140 Industrial Drive and adjacent to the Riverview Trail. The Waste Water Treatment Plant is undergoing a 5.25 million upgrade which began inn 2022 and is expected to be completed July 2023. Last upgrade was in 1986.

Pollution along the Flint river were once a problem but have vastly improved since the 1950s and 1960s after the Clean Water Act was enacted. The river is a now popular place for fishing, canoeing and kayaking.

The City of Flushing is supplied by surface water pumped from Lake Huron by the Karegnondi Water Authority and delivered by the Genesee County water supply system. The water source was previously Great Lakes Water Authority (GLWA) until November 2017 when Genesee County switched sources.

Electricity and natural gas are provided by Consumers Energy.

Parks and recreation 
 Flushing Riverview Trail is a city trail along the Flint River that connects to Flushing County Park

City parks 
 Riverview Park is a 7.4 acre city park located along the Flint river between the Main Street bridge and the DPW.
Mutton (Bonnie View) Park is a 3.5 acre city park located on the corner of Coutant St and Chestnut St
 Waterworks Park is a 4-acre city park off of Sunnyside Dr.
 Eastview Veterans' Memorial Park is a 14.4 acres park located off of Coutant St near Elms Rd.
 River Road Park is a 4.6 acre city park located off of River Rd near Morrish Rd.
 Cornwell Park is a city park .2 acre park located downtown on the south west corner of Main St and Cherry St. Cornwell park was established in 1961 after the relocation of Genesee Merchants Bank to Cherry St. The existing building was removed and the land donated to the village. A local business man Edgar L. Cornwell (October 17, 1866 - May 15, 1961) in his last civic gesture, established a trust fund to finance the conversion of the site into a park.

Events 
 Cruise Nights - Third Saturday of the Month April through September at the Flushing A near Riverview Park.
 Summer Festival - June. Starts with a parade and lasts five days with a carnival in Riverview Park, music, food and other activities.
 Art in the Park - June. Art vendors at Riverview Park.
 Concerts in the Park - Wednesday evenings June through August at Riverview Park.
 Movies in the Park - Saturday Evenings June through August at Riverview Park.
 Harvest Festival - September. downtown Flushing.
ref></ref>
 Candle Walk - December. Downtown Flushing.

Demographics

2020 census 
As of the census of 2020, there were 8,411 people, and 3,338 households. The racial makeup of the city was 95.7% White, 1.4% African American, 0.8% Native American, 0.1% Asian, 0.3% from other races, and 2.0% from two or more races. Hispanic or Latino of any race were 3.2% of the population.

There were 2.31 persons per household. 22.8% of residents were under the age of 18 and 24.6% were 65 years of age or older. The gender makeup of the city was 44.3% male and 54.7% female.

2010 census
As of the census of 2010, there were 8,389 people, 3,574 households, and 2,307 families residing in the city. The racial makeup of the city was 94.8% White, 2.4% African American, 0.4% Native American, 0.4% Asian, 0.3% from other races, and 1.6% from two or more races. Hispanic or Latino of any race were 2.2% of the population.

There were 3,574 households, of which 28.0% had children under the age of 18 living with them, 48.3% were married couples living together, 12.4% had a female householder with no husband present, 3.9% had a male householder with no wife present, and 35.5% were non-families. 32.7% of all households were made up of individuals, and 17.1% had someone living alone who was 65 years of age or older. The average household size was 2.30 and the average family size was 2.90.

The median age in the city was 45.1 years. 21.7% of residents were under the age of 18; 7.4% were between the ages of 18 and 24; 20.8% were from 25 to 44; 28.4% were from 45 to 64; and 21.7% were 65 years of age or older. The gender makeup of the city was 46.1% male and 53.9% female.

2000 census
As of the census of 2000, there were 8,348 people, 3,435 households, and 2,366 families residing in the city. The racial makeup of the city was 96.98% White, 0.63% African American, 0.32% Native American, 0.40% Asian, 0.04% Pacific Islander, 0.37% from other races, and 1.26% from two or more races. Hispanic or Latino of any race were 1.61% of the population.

There were 3,435 households, out of which 29.7% had children under the age of 18 living with them, 55.8% were married couples living together, 10.2% had a female householder with no husband present, and 31.1% were non-families. 28.4% of all households were made up of individuals, and 14.3% had someone living alone who was 65 years of age or older.  The average household size was 2.38 and the average family size was 2.92.

In the city, the population was spread out, with 23.0% under the age of 18, 6.5% from 18 to 24, 24.5% from 25 to 44, 26.3% from 45 to 64, and 19.7% who were 65 years of age or older.  The median age was 43 years. For every 100 females, there were 84.8 males.  For every 100 females age 18 and over, there were 80.7 males.

The median income for a household in the city was $54,010, and the median income for a family was $64,726. Males had a median income of $52,794 versus $31,502 for females. The per capita income for the city was $24,697.  About 4.4% of families and 4.7% of the population were below the poverty line, including 6.3% of those under age 18 and 6.9% of those age 65 or over.

Notable people

 Cornelia Moore Chillson Moots (1843–1929), missionary, temperance evangelist
 Shawn Cronin (1963) is a retired American professional ice hockey defenseman who played in the National Hockey League (NHL) for the Washington Capitals, Winnipeg Jets, Philadelphia Flyers and San Jose Sharks.
 Ralph M. Freeman (1902–1990) was a United States district judge of the United States District Court for the Eastern District of Michigan.
 John J. Gleason (1954) is a Democratic politician and current Clerk/Register of Deeds for Genesee County, Michigan.
 Halley H. Prosser (1870–1921), member of the Michigan House of Representatives
 Matthew Rettenmund (1968), author (Boy Culture)
 Ira Terry Sayre (1858–1926), Michigan state senator
 Amanda Somerville (1979), singer-songwriter, vocal coach
 Edmund G. Love, (1912–1990), author (Subways Are for Sleeping) 
 Tom Smallwood, (1977), professional ten-pin bowler

References

External links 
 City of Flushing Official Website
 Flushing Area Historical Society

 
Cities in Genesee County, Michigan
Populated places established in 1835
1835 establishments in Michigan Territory